Dabang Delhi T.T.C. (previously known as Dabang Smashers TTC) is an Indian professional table tennis franchise based in New Delhi, that plays in Ultimate Table Tennis. It was established in 2017 as one of the franchise in Ultimate Tennis League. They were champions of the league defeating Falcons TTC in the final of 2018 season, but lost out in the 2019 season after reaching the finals.

Players

Current squad

Honours

Domestic
 Ultimate Table Tennis
Winners (1): 2018

Current Season
In the third season of the Ultimate Table Tennis league in India, they gained a spot in the finals after defeating U Mumba but lost to the Chennai Lions in the finals

References

Sport in New Delhi
2017 establishments in Delhi
Ultimate Table Tennis
Table tennis clubs